The Lepidoptera of the Cook Islands consist of both the butterflies and moths recorded from the Cook Islands, a self-governing island country in the South Pacific Ocean.

According to a recent estimate, about 170 Lepidoptera species are present on the Cook Islands.

Butterflies

Lycaenidae
Famegana alsulus – black-spotted grass-blue
Jamides bochus – dark cerulean
Lampides boeticus – long-tailed blue
undescribed Nacaduba species
Zizina labradus – common grass-blue
Zizina otis – blue butterfly

Nymphalidae
Danaus plexippus – monarch butterfly
Euploea lewinii perryi – crow butterfly
Vagrans egista bowdenia – vagrant butterfly
Hypolimnas bolina – blue-moon butterfly
Junonia villida – Australian meadow-argus
Melanitis leda solandra – evening brown

Moths

Agonoxenidae
Agonoxena argaula – coconut flat-moth

Alucitidae
undescribed Alucita species

Arctiidae
Argina astrea – crotalaria pod-borer
Utetheisa pulchelloides – crimson-speckled footman

Carposinidae
undescribed Peragrarchis species

Choreutidae
Anthophila chalcotoxa
undescribed Brenthia species – banyan jumping-moth
undescribed Simaethis species

Cosmopterigidae
undescribed Asymphorodes species
Cosmopterix melanarches
Cosmopterix attenuatella 
Iressa neoleuca
Labdia dicyanitis
undescribed Labdia species – orange-with-navy moth
Pisistrata trypheropa
Pyroderces aellotricha
Pyroderces incertulella
Trissodoris honorariella – pandanus hole-cutter moth

Crambidae
Cnaphalocrocis medinalis – rice leafroller
Cnaphalocrocis poeyalis – lesser rice-leafroller
Cnaphalocrocis suspicalis
undescribed Diplopseustis or Sufetula species
Eurrhypodes tricoloralis
Glyphodes multilinealis – fig tiger-moth
Herpetogramma licarsisalis – tropical grass-moth
Maruca vitrata – bean-pod borer
Omiodes diemenalis – bean leafroller
Parotis suralis
Piletocera fluctualis
2 undescribed Prophantis species
Sameodes cancellalis
undescribed Scoparia species
Stemorrhages oceanitis – emerald crambus
Tatobotys biannulalis

Gelechiidae
undescribed Idiophantis species
Pectinophora gossypiella – bollworm
Phthorimaea operculella – potato tuberworm
Stoeberhinus testaceus – gelechiid moth
undescribed Thiotricha species

Geometridae
Anisodes samoana
undescribed Anisodes species
undescribed Chloroclystis species
Cleora stenoglypta – variable moth
Gymnoscelis concinna 
Gymnoscelis imparatalis – flower-looper moth
2 undescribed Gymnoscelis species
Thalassodes pilaria – big emerald
Ziridava dysorga

Gracillariidae
Caloptilia hilaropis – glochidion miner
undescribed Conopomorpha species
Ketapangia regulifera
Macarostola pontificalis
undescribed Stomphastis species

Hyblaeidae
Hyblaea puera – teak defoliator

Immidae
undescribed Imma species

Noctuidae
Achaea janata – castor-oil moth
Achaea serva
Aedia leucomelas – eastern alchymist
Agrotis ipsilon aneituma – greasy cutworm
Amyna axis
Amyna natalis
Anomis flava – cotton semi-looper
Anomis involuta – hibiscus cutworm
Anomis nigritarsis
Anticarsia irrorata – owl moth
Athetis nonagrica
Avatha discolor
Bombotelia jocosatrix – mango moth
Callopistria maillardi
Chasmina candida
Chasmina tibialis – satin moth
Chrysodeixis acuta – tomato semi-looper
Chrysodeixis eriosoma – southern silver-Y moth
Chrysodeixis illuminata
Condica illecta
Dysgonia arctotaenia
Dysgonia prisca – fruit-piercing moth
Earias huegeliana – rough bollworm
Earias perhuegeli – rough bollworm
Eublemma cochylioides
Eublemma crassiuscula
Eudocima fullonia – fruit-piercing moth
Heliothis assulta – tipworm
Hydrillodes melanozona – litter moth
Hypena gonospilalis
Hypena laceratalis – lantana hypena
Hypena longfieldae
Hypena masurialis
Hypocala deflorata
Lacera noctilio
Leucania loreyi – nightfeeding sugarcane armyworm
Leucania stenographa – sugarcane armyworm
Lucera oculalis
Maliattha ritsemae
Mocis frugalis – sugarcane looper
Mocis trifasciata
undescribed Mythimna species
undescribed Nigramma species
Nola insularum
Ophiusa coronata
Polydesma boarmioides
Rhesalides curvata
Simplicia caeneusalis
Spodoptera litura – tropical armyworm
Spodoptera mauritia – tropical-grass armyworm
Tiracola plagiata – cacao armyworm

Plutellidae
Plutella xylostella – diamondback moth
undescribed Terthroptera species

Pterophoridae
Exelastis pumilio
undescribed Platyptilia species
Sphenarches anisodactylus – tropical featherwing

Pyralidae
Crocidolomia pavonana – cabbage cluster-caterpillar
Cryptoblabes plagioleuca – mango-flower moth
Diaphania indica – cucumber moth
Endotricha mesenterialis
Etiella grisea – tropical legume-pod-borer
undescribed Eudonia or Sufetula species
Eurhodope ardescens – false blossum-moth
Hellula undalis – cabbage-centre grub
Hydriris ornatalis – kumara skeletoniser
Hymenia recurvalis – beetworm moth
undescribed Phycitinae species
Tirathaba rufivena – coconut spiked-moth

Sphingidae
Agrius convolvuli – sweet-potato hawkmoth
Gnathothlibus erotus – white-brow hawkmoth
Hippotion celerio – taro hawkmoth
Hippotion velox
Macroglossum hirundo – hummingbird hawkmoth

Stathmopodidae
undescribed Calicotis species – fern-sori moth

Thyrididae
Rhodoneura sericatalis – Terminalia cone-maker

Tineidae
Erechthias flavistriata – sugarcane budmoth
Erechthias pelotricha
Erechthias psammaula – brown-stripe moth
Erechthias simulans
Erechthias sphenacma
2 undescribed Erechthias species
Opogona aurisquamosa
Opogona regressa
Opogona trissostacta
Trachycentra calamias
Trachycentra chlorogramma
undescribed Trachycentra species

Tortricidae
Bactra litigatrix
undescribed Bactra species
Cryptophlebia pallifimbriata – fruit borer
Cryptophlebia rhynchias
Dudua aprobola – leaf-curling moth
Heleanna physaloides
Strepsicrates holotephras (Meyrick, 1924)
Tritopterna galena

Yponomeutidae
Prays parilis – citrus-blossom moth
undescribed Prays species

External links
Bishopmuseum.org: Cook Islands Biodiversity

Lepidoptera
Lepidoptera
Cook Islands
Cook Islands, New Zealand
Cook Islands
Cook Islands
Cook Islands
Lepidoptera, Cook Islands
Cook Islands